Mousa Balla Sowe (born 2 February 1997) is a Gambian professional footballer who plays as a left winger for Maltese club Ħamrun Spartans.

Club career
Sowe joined Serie D club Gela for the 2018–19 season.

References

External links
Profile at Parma Calcio

1997 births
Living people
Sportspeople from Banjul
Gambian footballers
Association football midfielders
Real de Banjul FC players
Parma Calcio 1913 players
U.S. Vibonese Calcio players
S.S.D. Città di Gela players
Serie C players
Serie D players
Gambian expatriate footballers
Expatriate footballers in Italy